Herbert Henry Maack (April 16, 1917 – May 5, 2007) was an American football player and coach.  He was the head coach of the Rhode Island Rams football team from 1956 through 1960. He compiled a 17–22–2 record and led the Rams to a share of the 1957 Yankee Conference championship.

Maack, a native of West New York, New Jersey, attended the Hun School of Princeton in Princeton for high school and then played football and basketball in college for the Columbia Lions. Maack played professionally for one season (1946) with the now-defunct Brooklyn Dodgers of the All-America Football Conference (AAFC).

Mack served as an officer in the United States Navy during World War II.  He won battle stars for his action in New Guinea and the Philippines before he was discharged as a lieutenant commander.

Head coaching record

Football

References

External links
 
 

1917 births
2007 deaths
American football tackles
American men's basketball players
Bucknell Bison football coaches
Brooklyn Dodgers (AAFC) players
Columbia Lions football coaches
Columbia Lions football players
Columbia Lions men's basketball players
Rhode Island Rams football coaches
College wrestling coaches in the United States
United States Navy officers
United States Navy personnel of World War II
Hun School of Princeton alumni
Sportspeople from Union City, New Jersey
People from West New York, New Jersey
People from Union City, New Jersey
Coaches of American football from New Jersey
Players of American football from New Jersey
Basketball players from New Jersey
Military personnel from New Jersey